"Amanece en la ruta" ("Sunrise on the route") is a song from the group of Argentine rock and new wave Suéter. It is the second song that is part of their second studio album Lluvia de gallinas; released in 1984 by 20th Century Records.

Interpretation of the lyrics 
The lyrics of the song tell a fictional story about seeing death in a car accident and being told in first person. The text itself is a fallacy; because its author explained that the text is fictional, although he dedicated it to a cousin, who died in a traffic accident.  Thus, the text is written from the place of the victim and the feelings they may have felt to experience death.

It has become a classic of Argentine rock and was ranked #95 of the top 100 songs of Argentine rock.

It has also been performed by artists as diverse as Fabiana Cantilo, Hilda Lizarazu, and Olivia Viggiano, among others.

References

1984 singles
Songs about death
1984 songs